Yolanda Leticia Peniche Blanco (born 26 April 1969) is a Mexican politician affiliated with the National Action Party. She served as Deputy of the LIX Legislature of the Mexican Congress as a plurinominal representative.

References

1969 births
Living people
Politicians from Yucatán (state)
Women members of the Chamber of Deputies (Mexico)
Members of the Chamber of Deputies (Mexico)
National Action Party (Mexico) politicians
Deputies of the LIX Legislature of Mexico
Universidad Mesoamericana de San Agustín alumni